Beatriz Isabelle Villaverde (born 5 June 1958) is an Argentine former professional tennis player Who has specialised in doubles.

She played in doubles at the French Open in 1977. Her partner in women's doubles, Argentina Viviana Segal lost in the first round to Yugoslavian Mima Jaušovec and Czechoslovak Renáta Tomanová.  Her partner in mixed doubles, Jaime Pinto Bravo lost in the Second round to French Patrick Proisy and Czechoslovak Regina Maršíková.

Career finals

Doubles (5–5)

References

External links
 
 

1958 births
Argentine female tennis players
Living people
20th-century Argentine women